Vera Molnár (born 1924) is a Hungarian media artist living and working in France. Molnar is widely considered to be a pioneer of computer art and generative art, and is also one of the first women to use computers in her art practice.

Born in Hungary, she studied aesthetics and art history at the Budapest College of Fine Arts. In the  1940s and 50s, she created non-representational paintings. By 1959 she was making combinatorial images; in 1968 she would use a computer to create her first algorithmic drawings. 

In the 1960s she founded two groups in France concerned with the use of technology within the arts: the Groupe de Recherche d’Art Visuel and Art et Informatique. 1976 took place her first solo exhibition in the gallery of the London Polytechnic.

Her work has been widely collected by major museums; in 2007 she was named a Chevalier of Arts and Letters in France.

She was selected as one of 213 artists for the 59th Venice Biennale in 2022.

Life
Vera Molnár, born 1924 in Hungary, is one of the pioneers of computer and algorithmic arts. Trained as a traditional artist, Molnár studied for a diploma in art history and aesthetics at the Budapest College of Fine Arts. She iterated combinatorial images from as early as 1959. In 1968 she began working with computers, where she began to create algorithmic paintings based on simple geometric shapes and geometrical themes.

Work
Molnár created her first non-representational images in 1946. These were abstract geometrical and systematically determined paintings. In 1947 she received an artists’ fellowship to study in Rome at the Villa Giulia, and shortly after moved to France, where she currently resides.

In the 1960s, Molnár co-founded several artist research groups. The first, in 1960, was Groupe de Recherche d’Art Visuel, which investigate collaborative approaches to mechanical and kinetic art. The second was Art et Informatique, with a focus on art and computing. Molnar learned the early programming languages of Fortran and Basic, and gained access to a computer at a research lab in Paris where she began to make computer graphic drawings on a plotter.

Legacy
Molnár was part of the 2010 exhibition "On Line: Drawing Through the Twentieth Century" at the Museum of Modern Art in New York. The exhibition demonstrated the history of drawing lines. 

A 2015 retrospective exhibition called "Regarding the Infinite | Drawings 1950-1987" was held at Senior & Shopmaker Gallery in New York City.

Awards
In 2005 Molnár received the DAM Digital Arts Award for her life’s work, which includes €20,000 prize, and a cataloged exhibition. Vera Molnár’s exhibit, (Un)Ordnung.(Dés)Ordre. at the Museum Haus Konstruktiv shows her early freehand drawings never exhibited before, from her late-1960s to the new installation at Museum Haus Konstruktiv.

Molnár was appointed Chevalier of Arts and Letters (2007), and won the outstanding merit award AWARE in 2018.

Molnár is one of 213 artists announced as part of the 59th Venice Biennale in 2022. The theme for the Venice Biennale is to "Challenge the Idea of ‘Men as the Center of the Universe’".

Collections
Frac Lorraine, France
Museum of Fine Arts Houston
Museum of Modern Art, New York City
Museum Ritter, Waldenbuch, Germany
Morgan Library & Museum
National Gallery of Art, Washington D.C.
Tate Museum, London
Victoria and Albert Museum, London

References

External links
 Official website
 Official Artnet page
 Official MoMa page
 Official Getty Page
 Official Artsy page

1924 births
Living people
20th-century French women artists
21st-century French women artists
20th-century Hungarian women artists
21st-century Hungarian women artists
Artists from Budapest
Hungarian emigrants to France
French digital artists
Women digital artists
French contemporary artists
Hungarian contemporary artists